The Military Manpower Administration is one of a military  organizations in South Korea and is run under the Ministry of National Defense. The headquarters are in Seo District, Daejeon.

History
July 17, 1948: Assignment of military affairs made by the Ministry of National Defense
September 1, 1949: Transfer of control to Troop Military District Command under the banner of Army Headquarters
July 1, 2002: Transfer of control of jurisdiction to Military Manpower Administration

See also
 Conscription in South Korea

References

External links

Official website 

Government agencies of South Korea
Organizations based in Daejeon
Manpower Administration
South Korea